Paul Bassim, O.C.D., (14 November 1922 – 21 August 2012) was a Lebanese bishop of the Catholic Church.

Biography
Bassim was born in Zgharta, Lebanon and as a young man became a friar of the Order of Discalced Carmelites. He was ordained a Roman Catholic priest on 29 June 1946.

Bassim was appointed Vicar Apostolic of the Apostolic Vicariate of Beirut for which he was appointed as the titular bishop of Laodicea ad Libanum on 8 September 1974, and consecrated on 23 November 1974, by Archbishop Alfredo Bruniera. He would hold the position of Vicar Apostolic until his retirement on 30 July 1999.

Bassim was a member of the Conference of the Latin Bishops of the Arab Regions. He was also responsible for the Pastoral Care of Afro-Asian migrants (PCAAM) living as migrant workers in the Arab regions.

Bassim died on 21 August 2012.

References

External links
 Catholic-Hierarchy 
 Order of Discalced Carmelites

1922 births
2012 deaths
People from Zgharta
Discalced Carmelite bishops
20th-century Roman Catholic bishops in Lebanon
21st-century Roman Catholic bishops in Lebanon
20th-century Roman Catholic titular bishops
Lebanese Roman Catholic bishops